The Anna Jagiellon Bridge is a highway bridge, part of the S2 expressway, across the Vistula in Warsaw, Poland. The bridge links the Węzeł Warszawa Wschodnia junction, in Wilanów, with Węzeł Wał Miedzeszyński junction, in Wawer. It is the ninth bridge in Warsaw, and the longest and most southern river crossing across the Vistula in Warsaw.

The construction of the bridge began in June 2017 and was set to be complete in the third quarter of 2020. This deadline was not met and the bridge opened for public use on 22 December 2020.

Name
Before the present name, the name of the bridge was the generic Southern Bridge, named after the bridge's location in southern Warsaw. This name was used in numerous planning studies and documents, so over time it began to be commonly treated as the name after completion.

In 2021, the mayor of Warsaw, Rafał Trzaskowski, announced that he would submit an application to the Warsaw City Council to name the bridge after Polish queen Anna Jagiellon. Earlier, there were proposals to name the new bridge after the Great Orchestra of Christmas Charity, the Battle of Warsaw Bridge, or the Piłsudski Legions Bridge.

The idea of naming the bridge in honour of Anna Jagiellon was positively assessed by the City Nomenclature Team. On 10 June 2021, the Warsaw City Council adopted a resolution that she will be the patron of the bridge.

References

Bridges completed in 2020
Bridges in Warsaw
Road bridges in Poland